The 1878 Treaty of San Stefano (Peace of San-Stefano, ; Peace treaty of San-Stefano,  or ) was a treaty between the Russian and Ottoman empires at the conclusion of the Russo-Turkish War of 1877–1878.

According to the official Russian position, by signing the treaty, Russia had never intended anything more than a temporary rough draft, so as to enable a final settlement with the other Great Powers.

The treaty provided for the establishment of an autonomous Principality of Bulgaria following almost 500 years of Ottoman rule in the Bulgarian lands. Bulgarians celebrate the day the treaty was signed, as Liberation Day. However, the enlarged Bulgaria envisioned by the treaty alarmed neighboring states as well as France and Great Britain.  As a result, the enlargement was never implemented, being superseded by the Treaty of Berlin following the Congress of the same name that took place three months later.

Effects

On Bulgaria
 The treaty established the autonomous self-governing Principality of Bulgaria, with a Christian government and the right to keep an army. Though still de jure tributary to the Ottomans, the Principality de facto functioned as an independent nation. Its territory included the plain between the Danube and the Balkan mountain range (Stara Planina), the region of Sofia, Pirot and Vranje in the Morava valley, Northern Thrace, parts of Eastern Thrace and nearly all of Macedonia (Article 6).

Bulgaria would thus have had direct access to the Mediterranean. This carried the potential of Russian ships eventually using Bulgarian Mediterranean ports as naval bases - which the other Great Powers greatly disliked.

A prince elected by the people, approved by the Ottoman Empire, and recognized by the Great Powers was to take the helm of the country (Article 7). A council of Bulgarian noblemen was to draft a constitution (also Article 7). (They produced the Tarnovo Constitution.) Ottoman troops were to withdraw from Bulgaria, while Russian troops would remain for two more years (Article 8).

According to Philip Roeder, the Treaty of San Stefano "transformed" Bulgarian nationalism, turning it from a disunited movement into a united one.

Montenegro, Serbia, and Romania
Under the treaty, Montenegro more than doubled its territory, acquiring formerly Ottoman-controlled areas including the cities of Nikšić, Podgorica, and Bar (Article 1), and the Ottoman Empire recognized its independence (Article 2).

Serbia gained the cities of Niš and Leskovac in Moravian Serbia and became independent (Article 3).

Turkey recognized the independence of Romania (Article 5) while the latter gained Northern Dobruja from Russia (to which it was transferred from the Ottoman Empire) and ceded Southern Bessarabia in a forced exchange.

On Russia and the Ottoman Empire

In exchange for war reparations, the Sublime Porte ceded Armenian and Georgian territories in the Caucasus to Russia, including Ardahan, Artvin, Batum, Kars, Olti, Beyazit, and Alashkert. Additionally, it ceded Northern Dobruja, which Russia handed to Romania in exchange for Southern Bessarabia (Article 19).

On other regions
The Vilayet of Bosnia (Bosnia and Herzegovina) was supposed to become an autonomous province (Article 14). Crete, Epirus and Thessaly were to receive a limited form of local self-government (Article 15), while the Ottomans vouched for their earlier-given promises to handle reforms in Armenia in order to protect the Armenians from abuse (Article 16). The Straits—the Bosporus and the Dardanelles—were declared open to all neutral ships in war and peacetime (Article 24).

The Circassians of the newly liberated Balkan territories, who had been settled there in 1864 following the Circassian genocide and had committed several atrocities against the Christian population of the region during the war, were to be expelled. This way, the Circassian minority in Dobruja disappeared.

Reaction

The Great Powers, especially British Prime Minister Benjamin Disraeli, were unhappy with this extension of Russian power, and Serbia feared that the establishment of Greater Bulgaria would harm its interests in the former and remaining Ottoman territories. These reasons prompted the Great Powers to obtain a revision of the treaty at the Congress of Berlin, and substitute it with the Treaty of Berlin.

Romania, which had contributed significantly to the Russian victory in the war, was extremely disappointed by the treaty, and the Romanian public perceived some of its stipulations as Russia breaking the Russo-Romanian pre-war treaties that guaranteed the integrity of Romanian territory.

Austria-Hungary was disappointed with the treaty as it failed to expand its influence in Bosnia and Herzegovina.

The Albanians, dwelling in provinces controlled by the Ottoman Empire, objected to what they considered a significant loss of their territory to Serbia, Bulgaria, and Montenegro and realized they would have to organize nationally to attract the assistance of foreign powers seeking to neutralize Russia's influence in the region. The implications of the treaty led to the formation of the League of Prizren.

In the "Salisbury Circular" of 1 April 1878, the British Foreign Secretary Robert Cecil, made clear his and his government's objections to the Treaty of San Stefano and the favorable position in which it left Russia.

According to British historian A. J. P. Taylor, writing in 1954: "If the treaty of San Stefano had been maintained, both the Ottoman Empire and Austria-Hungary might have survived to the present day. The British, except for [Disraeli] in his wilder moments, had expected less and were therefore less disappointed. Salisbury wrote at the end of 1878 'We shall set up a rickety sort of Turkish rule again south of the Balkans. But it is a mere respite. There is no vitality left in them.'"

Critical reevaluation of the treaty in Bulgaria since the 1990s
Since 1990, a number of historians, publicists and journalists in Bulgaria have subjected the Treaty of San Stefano and the entire policy of the Russian Empire on the Eastern question in the 19th century to critical reevaluation, concluding that the Treaty was a "charade" crafted by the long-standing Russian ambassador to the Ottoman Empire, Count Nikolay Ignatyev, for the purpose of securing Russian interests in Bulgaria and fomenting lasting anti-Western sentiment in Bulgarian society.

The Russian Empire's objectives
Drawing on the texts of the 1876 Reichstadt Agreement, the 1877 Budapest Convention, various correspondence during the time period as well as, in particular, Count Ignatyev's own unfiltered thoughts in his diaries, all researchers draw the conclusion that the Russian Empire's only ambition was to conquer the Turkish straits, in continuation of Catherine the Great's Greek Plan.

They argue that the "Bulgarian Question" and the liberation of the Bulgarians were only used as a political ruse and a stepping stone to Constantinople.As indicated in Ignatyev's Diaries, if the Russian plan had succeeded, Bulgarians would have ultimately been placed under Russian control, by either subjecting them to direct Russian or indirect Serbian rule or ruling them as a puppet state.

Count Ignatyev's role in securing Russian imperial policy
Whereas in traditional Bulgarian—and international—historiography, Ignatyev is generally presented as a great friend of Bulgaria and an advocate of Bulgarian liberation, his Diaires present him rather as a Machiavellian politician, completely dedicated to furthering Russian imperialist expansion on the Balkans.

Among other things, Ignatyev is found to have continuously subverted the struggle for independent Bulgarian Church in the 1860s and the 1870s, the success of which played a crucial role in Bulgarian nation-building. He is further implicated to have advocated for the hanging of the founder of the Bulgarian Internal Revolutionary Organisation (IRO), Vasil Levski, before the Ottoman authorities in an attempt to make the IRO, until then hostile to any foreign involvement, more amenable to Russian desires. 

Indzhev, in particular, notes that by eliminating IRO's ideologue and leader, hellbent on liberation "by own means", and maligning 19th-century Bulgarian bourgeoisie (e.g., Stoyan Chomakov), which favoured gaining autonomy by working together with the Ottoman authorities, Ignatyev's work blocked both Bulgaria's "revolutionary" and "evolutionary" path of development, making "liberation by Russia", the scenario giving Russia direct control over Bulgarian affairs, the only option left.

The April Uprising and its consequences
Between 1855 and 1865, the Ottoman authorities settled 300,000 Crimean Tatar, Circassian and other Muslim Caucasian Muhacir in the Danube Vilayet. While the settlement of Crimean Tatars was largely problem-free, the scarcity of arable land, the sheer scale of Circassian migration and the inability of Ottoman authorities to properly address problems turned the Circassian settlement into a disaster that drove impoverished Circassians to either join paramilitary (i.e., bashi-bazouk) units or turn to banditry and crime. Ottoman inability to restore social order turned into a direct cause of the Bulgarian April Uprising in 1876, whose bloody suppression generated widespread indignation and condemnation in Europe.

And while most Great Powers were still deliberating what action to take, eventually reaching agreement to convene the Constantinople Conference in late December 1876, the Russian Empire and Austria-Hungary had already apportioned the Ottoman holdings in Europe amongst themselves by virtue of the Reichstadt Agreement of 8 July 1876, more than half a year before. The agreement was reconfirmed and elaborated further in the Budapest Convention of 15 January 1877.

The Reichstadt and Budapest treaties
Both treaties—kept entirely secret—envisaged Russian war on the Ottoman Empire, with Austria-Hungary pledging neutrality. The Russian Empire in turn pledged not to create a big Slavic state, but only two independent principalities or two autonomous Ottoman vilayets (version varies depending on language) north and south of the Balkan Range. In turn, Austria-Hungary was given permission to annex Bosnia and Herzegovina. The treaties also envisaged Romania to cede southern Bessarabia to the Russian Empire, territorial acquisitions for Greece, etc.

All researchers have noted the pronounced similarity of the clauses of the two secret treaties to the provisions of the Berlin Treaty and the stark contrast of the three to the territorial provisions of the Treaty of San Stefano, inferring that the Russian Empire never had any actual intent to implement it. 

In view of Ignatyev's dedication to Russian imperialism and his past disregard for Bulgarian interests, the universal conclusion here is that the Treaty of San Stefano was a "ruse", "deceit", "fraud", "trap", "decoy" and that it was signed by Ignatyev for propaganda purposes only, in order to closely tie the nascent Bulgarian state to the Russian Empire by pretending that it was their only protector, while simultaneously blaming the inevitable break-up of San Stefano Bulgaria on the other Great Powers, thus sowing permanent distrust of them in Bulgarian society.

Sabotaging the Constantinople Conference as casus belli for the Russo-Turkish War (1877–1878)
However, in particular, Indzhev, Doychev, Gochev and Yordanov do not draw the line here. After comparing the dates of signing of the Budapest Convention (15 January 1877) and Grand Vizier Midhat Pasha's refusal (18 January 1877) to accede to the Great Powers' proposal at the Constantinople Conference for the creation of two autonomous Bulgarian vilayets, after taking into account Ignatyev's own memos in his 1875–1878 Diaries, among other things, his allegation that"The Ottoman Sultan trusts the Russian ambassador fully" (p.72-73), the insistence that

"the Bulgarians... should be turned into an obedient tool of Russian policy and into our permanent allies by annihilating any option for them to cross to the enemy side" (pp.51-53) and that

"the Austrian and Turkish Slavs must be our allies and tools of our policy towards Germany" (pp.51-53),  the warning that

"if the nations that rebelled against the Turks fall under Western rather than our influence, the situation on the Balkans will become far more untenable for Russia than it is now" (p.58), etc.and after analysing which Great Power would benefit most from sabotaging the Constantinople Conference, they conclude that the culprit can only be the Russian Empire.

Traditionally, Bulgarian historiography has, in line with Russian propaganda, always cast the blame for the failure of the Conference on the go-to villain in modern Bulgarian history, the English. However, the vilayet autonomy proposal reflected all of the United Kingdom's desires by splitting the autonomous territory in two and ensuring extensive international (including English) oversight of vilayet affairs, which would have preventied the autonomies from becoming Russian puppets.

The inability to subjugate the Bulgarians to its long-term goals and policy and the desire to keep Western influence out of the Balkans are argued to be the very reasons for the Russian Empire's unwillingness to commit to the proposals of the Conference. While a war would have drastically reduced the territory of the future Bulgarian state, it would have given the Empire free rein to dictate its affairs. Russia's intent to go to war as early as July 1876, as stipulated in the Reichstadt Agreement, is adduced as a further argument that the Constantinople Conference was rather an obstacle than a solution to the Bulgarian Crisis for the Empire.

Here Indzhev and Gochev hypothesise that Ignatyev secured the Ottomans' cooperation by assuring them that any territory they would lose in a potential war would be far smaller than the territory of the two autonomous vilayets, which largely overlapped with the borders of the Bulgarian Exarchate. Indeed, the Principality of Bulgaria created after the Russo-Turkish War (1877–1878) covered less than 40% of the territory of the autonomous vilayets.

In this connection, several of the authors have also noted the unwillingness of the Russian administration to ever refer to the Bulgarians with their national name and to instead call them "Slavs" and "Orthodox Christians" before the war and to subsequently use designations such as "Russian-Danubian Province", "Balkan Province", "occupation fund" and "occupation" until the terms of the Berlin Treaty defined the organisation of the future Bulgarian Principality and gave the Russian occupation corps explicit deadlines for retreat.

In particular, Indzhev, Doychev and Yordanov have opined that if the Russian troops had not been forced to withdraw in Berlin, they would have never left.

Myth of San Stefano
Numerous authors conclude that the carefully crafted myth of San Stefano has caused lasting harm to Bulgarian statehood by making Bulgarians vulnerable to Russian propaganda and depriving them of the ability to exercise judgement at critical junctures in their history.

In particular, Aleksandar Tatsov, Yanko Gochev, Plamen Tzvetkov and Alexander Yordanov have referred to the Balkan Wars, where the false belief of several successive Russophile cabinets that "Russia will help Bulgaria because it did so in San Stefano" essentially made the country's entire future dependent on a foreign power that had anathemised the Unification of Bulgaria, invited the Ottoman Sultan to reconquer Eastern Rumelia and organised a coup against the Bulgarian Prince only three decades prior. 

Bulgarian journalist Ivo Indzhev focuses on the vulnerability of modern Bulgaria to Russian propaganda, including with regard to the 2022 Russian Invasion of Ukraine, and points out that "the myth of San Stefano" remains, to this day, the most effective tool for generating pro-Russian and anti-Western sentiment in Bulgarian society. Finally, Tsvetkov bluntly states that unless Bulgarian society overcomes what he refers to as "its San Stefano inferiority complex" and "self-degrading Russophilia", he is not optimistic about the future of the country.

In this connection, quite notably and despite being unaware of either the Reichstadt and Budapest Treaties or Count Ignatyev's Diaries, Bulgarian statesman and long-standing prime-minister Stefan Stambolov held similar beliefs as early as the 1880s. He considered tbe Russo-Turkish War (1877–1878) to be an attempt by Tsarist Russia to turn Bulgaria into a protectorate and preferred a union with Romania or even a dual Bulgarian-Turkish state, rather than further involvement with the Empire.

Gallery

In popular culture

The circumstances leading to the signing of the Treaty of San Stefano are depicted in Boris Akunin's historical novel The Turkish Gambit. Akunin in general sticks to known historical facts, though he attributes some acts to fictional characters such as his recurrent protaginist Erast Fandorin.

See also

 Treaty of Berlin (1878)
 Bulgarian irredentism
 History of Bulgaria

References

External links
 
The Preliminary Treaty of Peace, signed at San Stefano - Full text, in English.
Full text of the San Stefano Preliminary Treaty (in Russian)

Maps
Bulgaria in the borders after the Treaties of Constantinople, San-Stephano, Berlin, London, Bucharest and Neuilly. Scale 1:1600000 map. (in German)

1878 in Bulgaria
1878 in the Ottoman Empire
1878 treaties
Russo-Turkish wars
Russo-Turkish War (1877–1878)
San Stefano
Macedonia under the Ottoman Empire
19th century in Armenia
19th century in Georgia (country)
San Stefano, Treaty of
Ottoman Empire–Russia treaties
History of Istanbul Province
History of Adjara
Ottoman period in Georgia (country)
March 1878 events
History of Montenegro